Trek–Segafredo is a professional cycling team that competes in elite road bicycle racing events such as the UCI Women's World Tour.

History 
In July 2018, Cyclingnews reported that a new UCI Women's team would be set up by the same management as the men's UCI WorldTeam  program. Days later the team announced that  rider Lizzie Deignan would lead the team. The following month Elisa Longo Borghini confirmed that she would also be joining the team.

In August Ina-Yoko Teutenberg announced that she would be directing the newly announced team as their head directeur sportif. The same month Giorgia Bronzini announced that she would retire at the end of the season and become a DS with the team in 2019.

In September, it was announced that the team had secured further sponsorship from the Massimo Zanetti Beverage Group, owner of the Italian coffee brand Segafredo, in a deal covering a two-year co-title partnership, and the women's team would then be known as Trek–Segafredo, like the men's.

Team roster

Major results 

2019
 Stage 1 Women's Tour Down Under, Letizia Paternoster
 Stage 1 Setmana Ciclista Valenciana, Ruth Winder
 Stages 2 & 4 Setmana Ciclista Valenciana, Lotta Lepistö
 Drentse Acht van Westerveld, Audrey Cordon-Ragot
 Dwars door Vlaanderen, Ellen van Dijk
 Stage 4a (ITT) Healthy Ageing Tour, Ellen van Dijk
  Overall Emakumeen Bira, Elisa Longo Borghini
 Points classification
 Mountains classification
Stage 3, Tayler Wiles
Stage 4, Elisa Longo Borghini
  Overall The Women's Tour, Lizzie Deignan
 Points classification, Lizzie Deignan
 British rider classification, Lizzie Deignan
Team classification
Stage 5, Lizzie Deignan
 Postnord UCI WWT Vårgårda West Sweden TTT
2020
  Overall Women's Tour Down Under, Ruth Winder
Stage 2, Ruth Winder
 GP de Plouay, Lizzie Deignan
 La Course by Le Tour de France, Lizzie Deignan
 Stage 1 (TTT), Giro Rosa
2021
  Overall Healthy Ageing Tour, Ellen van Dijk
 Combined classification, Ellen van Dijk
Stage 2 (ITT), Ellen van Dijk
 Trofeo Alfredo Binda, Elisa Longo Borghini
 Brabantse Pijl Dames Gooik, Ruth Winder
  Overall Thüringen Ladies Tour, Lucinda Brand
Stages 3 & 5, Lucinda Brand
Team classification
 Prologue Lotto Belgium Tour, Ellen van Dijk
 Stage 1 (TTT), Giro Rosa
 Stage 4 Ladies Tour of Norway, Chloe Hosking
 GP de Plouay, Elisa Longo Borghini
 Tour Cycliste Féminin International de l'Ardèche
Stage 3, Chloe Hosking
Stage 4, Ruth Winder
Stage 7, Lucinda Brand
 Paris–Roubaix, Lizzie Deignan
2022
 Stage 1 Setmana Ciclista Valenciana, Elisa Balsamo
 Stage 2 Setmana Ciclista Valenciana, Ellen van Dijk
  Overall Bloeizone Fryslân Tour, Ellen van Dijk
Stage 1 (ITT), Ellen van Dijk
 Trofeo Alfredo Binda, Elisa Balsamo
 Classic Brugge–De Panne, Elisa Balsamo
 Gent–Wevelgem, Elisa Balsamo
 Paris–Roubaix, Elisa Longo Borghini
 Postnord UCI WWT Vårgårda West Sweden TTT

National and Continental Champions 

2019
  Swiss Cyclo-cross, Jolanda Neff
  Poland Time Trial, Anna Plichta
  United States Road Race, Ruth Winder
  European Time Trial, Ellen van Dijk
2020
  Poland Time Trial, Anna Plichta
  Italy Time Trial, Elisa Longo Borghini
  Italy Road Race, Elisa Longo Borghini
  France Road Race, Audrey Cordon-Ragot
2021
  France Time Trial, Audrey Cordon-Ragot
  Italy Time Trial, Elisa Longo Borghini
  Italy Road Race, Elisa Longo Borghini
  Denmark Road Race, Amalie Dideriksen
  European Road Race, Ellen van Dijk
  World Time Trial, Ellen van Dijk
  World Track (Elimination race), Letizia Paternoster
  European Cyclo-cross, Lucinda Brand
  European U23 Cyclo-cross, Shirin van Anrooij
  Denmark Track (Points race), Amalie Dideriksen
  Denmark Track (Omnium), Amalie Dideriksen
  Denmark Track (Madison), Amalie Dideriksen
2022
  Netherlands Time Trial, Ellen van Dijk
  Italy Time Trial, Elisa Longo Borghini
  Netherlands U23 Time Trial, Shirin van Anrooij
  France Time Trial, Audrey Cordon-Ragot
  United States Time Trial, Leah Thomas
  France Road Race, Audrey Cordon-Ragot

Notes

References

External links 
 
 

UCI Women's Teams
Cycling teams established in 2018
Women's cycling teams